William Walton (1716–1780) was an English Roman Catholic bishop who served as the Vicar Apostolic of the Northern District of England from 1775 to 1780.

Born in Manchester on 9 December 1716, he was the son of Michael and Mary Walton. He entered the English College, Douai in October 1731 and received the four minor orders on 20 April 1737. During the next few years he was ordained a sub-deacon on 29 May 1739, a deacon on 23 May 1739, and a priest on 3 April 1741. He left Douai on 4 June 1748 to serve on the English mission.

He was appointed coadjutor to Francis Petre, Vicar Apostolic of the Northern District on 18 July 1770. Later in the same year, he was consecrated Titular Bishop of Dragobitia by Francis Petre. On Bishop Petre's death on 24 December 1775, Bishop Walton automatically succeeded as Vicar Apostolic of the Northern District.

He died in office at York on 26 February 1780, aged 63, and buried at St Michael le Belfrey, York.

References

Bibliography

 

1716 births
1780 deaths
Clergy from Manchester
18th-century Roman Catholic bishops in England
Apostolic vicars of England and Wales